Oklahomans for Children and Families (OCAF) is a nonprofit organization that lobbies against media that the group finds offensive.  The group has targeted bookstores, libraries, and comic book shops to stop the distribution of books and magazines it calls pornographic.

OCAF is best known for its lobbying of Congress for passage of the Telecommunications Act of 1996, demanding that internet service providers stop offering Usenet newsgroups which contain sexual content. OCAF is also the subject of the documentary Banned In Oklahoma (2004) about the organizations efforts, ultimately unsuccessful, to remove the movie The Tin Drum from Oklahoma libraries and movie rental businesses, 18 years after the film's release.

History 
The group was founded in 1984 as Oklahomans Against Pornography in an effort to force Oklahoma-based cable television companies to remove Playboy TV from their line-ups.

In 1996, the group accused an Oklahoma City comic book store of "trafficking in obscene materials" because it was selling copies of publisher Verotik's Verotika anthology issue #4:

OCAF is currently defunct. One of OCAF's leaders, Paul Wesselhoft, is now a member of the Oklahoma state government for Moore, Oklahoma. He continues promoting a religious right agenda.

References

1984 establishments in Oklahoma
Legal advocacy organizations in the United States
Lobbying organizations in the United States
Organizations based in Oklahoma